Black Ankle is an  unincorporated community in San Augustine County, Texas, United States.

According to tradition, Black Ankle was so named when a woman covered an inconvenient hole in her black stocking with soot. Little remains of the original town.

References 

Unincorporated communities in Texas
Unincorporated communities in San Augustine County, Texas
Ghost towns in East Texas